The Federation of Bosnia and Herzegovina is one of the two entities within the State of Bosnia and Herzegovina, the other being Republika Srpska. The Federation of Bosnia and Herzegovina consists of ten autonomous cantons with their own governments and legislatures.

The Federation was created by the 1994 Washington Agreement, which ended the Croat–Bosniak War within the Bosnian War, and established a constituent assembly that continued its work until October 1996.

The Federation has a capital, government, president, parliament, customs and police departments and two postal systems. It occupies about half of the land of Bosnia and Herzegovina. From 1996 until 2005 it had its own army, the Army of the Federation of Bosnia and Herzegovina, later merged in the Armed Forces of Bosnia and Herzegovina. The capital and largest city is Sarajevo with 275,524 inhabitants.

History

The basis for the creation of the Federation of Bosnia and Herzegovina were laid down by the Washington Agreement of March 1994. Under the agreement, the combined territory held by the Army of the Republic of Bosnia and Herzegovina and the Croatian Defence Council forces was to be divided into ten autonomous cantons along the lines of the Vance-Owen plan. The cantonal system was selected to prevent dominance of one ethnic group over another. However, much of the territory Croats and Bosniaks claimed for their Federation was at that point still controlled by the Bosnian Serbs.

The Washington Agreement was implemented during the spring of 1994, by convoking a Constitutional Assembly, which on June 24 adopted and proclaimed the Constitution of the Federation of Bosnia and Herzegovina.

In 1995, Bosnian government forces and Bosnian Croat forces of the Federation of Bosnia and Herzegovina defeated forces of the Autonomous Province of Western Bosnia, and this territory was added to the federation (Una-Sana Canton).

Post-war

By the Dayton Agreement of 1995 that ended the four-year war, the Federation of Bosnia and Herzegovina was defined as one of the two entities of Bosnia and Herzegovina, comprising 51% of country's area, alongside Republika Srpska. Cantons and federal structure were built rather slowly after the war. Separatist Croat  Herzeg-Bosnia institutions existed and functioned parallel to Federation ones up until 1996–97, when they were phased out. On 8 March 2000, the Brčko District was formed as an autonomous district within Bosnia and Herzegovina and it was created from part of the territory of both Bosnian entities. Brčko District is now a condominium that belongs to both entities.

In 2001–2002, the Office of the High Representative (OHR) imposed amendments to the Federation's Constitution and its electoral law, in compliance with the decisions of the Constitutional Court of Bosnia and Herzegovina on the political equality of the three constituent peoples (U-5/98). This triggered the grievances of Bosnian Croats, who claimed they were deprived of their rights to representation as Bosniaks had come to control the majority in the upper house as well.
Dissatisfied Croat politicians set up a separate Croatian National Assembly, held a referendum parallel to the elections and proclaimed their self-rule in Croat-majority areas in the Federation. Their attempts ended shortly after a crackdown by SFOR and legal proceedings.

Dissatisfied with the representation of Croats in the Federation, Croat political parties insist on creating a Croat-majority federal unit instead of several cantons. SDA and other Bosniak parties strongly oppose this. In September 2010, the International Crisis Group warned that "disputes among and between Bosniak and Croat leaders and a dysfunctional administrative system have paralyzed decision-making, put the entity on the verge of bankruptcy and triggered social unrest". In January 2017, Croatian National Assembly stated that "if Bosnia and Herzegovina wants to become self-sustainable, then it is necessary to have an administrative-territorial reorganization, which would include a federal unit with a Croatian majority. It remains the permanent aspiration of the Croatian people of Bosnia and Herzegovina."

In 2010–14 the Federation's Government was formed by SDP without the consent of major Croat political parties, leading to a political crisis.

In parallel to EU-facilitated talks on the Sejdic-Finci issue at State level, in February 2013 the US embassy supported an expert working group which presented its 188 recommendations to the FBIH House of Representatives in 2013, aiming to address the costly and complex governance structures with overlapping competences between the Federation, the Cantons and the municipalities as currently entailed in the Federation Constitution. The initiative was finally not adopted by the Parliament.

Following an appeal by HDZ BiH Božo Ljubić, in December 2016 the Constitutional Court of Bosnia and Herzegovina abolished the electoral formula for the indirect election of the Federation House of People, stating that it did not guarantee the legitimate representation of constituent peoples. Notably, the ruling did not concur with an amicus curiae opinion of the Venice Commission on the same matter. Lacking legislative amendments to revise the Election Law, in Summer 2018 the Central Election Commission of Bosnia and Herzegovina provisionally enacted a new formula for the composition of the House of People, based on the minimal representation formula (one deputy per each constituent people per each canton) and on the 2013 census.

In 2022, the High Representative imposed amendments to the federal Constitution and the Election Law, implementing the Ljubic verdict. The changes also reconstructed the original balance of power between Croats and Bosniaks in the Federation, as envisioned in Washington Agreement.

Geographic boundary

The Inter-Entity Boundary Line (IEBL) that distinguishes Bosnia and Herzegovina's two entities runs along the frontlines as they existed at the end of the Bosnian War, with adjustments (most importantly in the western part of the country and around Sarajevo), as defined by the Dayton Agreement. The total length of the IEBL is approximately  km. The IEBL is an administrative demarcation and not controlled by the military or police and there is free movement across it.

Five of the cantons (Una-Sana, Tuzla, Zenica-Doboj, Bosnian Podrinje and Sarajevo) are Bosniak-majority cantons, three (Posavina, West Herzegovina and Canton 10) are Croat-majority cantons, and two (Central Bosnia and Herzegovina-Neretva) are 'ethnically mixed', meaning there are special legislative procedures for protection of the constituent peoples.

A significant portion of Brčko District was also part of the Federation; however, when the district was created, it became shared territory of both entities, but it was not placed under control of either of the two, and is hence under direct jurisdiction of Bosnia and Herzegovina. Currently the Federation of Bosnia and Herzegovina has 79 municipalities.

Politics
The government and politics of the Federation are dominated by two large parties, the Bosniak Party of Democratic Action (SDA) and the Croatian Democratic Union of Bosnia and Herzegovina (HDZ BiH).

Entity-level institutions include:
Federation President with two vice-presidents (list of presidents of FBiH)
Federation Government with guaranteed ethnic representation (list of prime ministers of FBiH)
Bicameral Parliament: 
House of Representatives as the lower house and 
House of Peoples as the upper house, protecting the interests of three constituent peoples; 
Federation Constitutional Court.

Since Bosniaks compose roughly 70.4% of Federation's population, Croats 22.4% and Serbs just around 2%, the Parliament's House of Peoples (with equal representation for all three nationalities) is supposed to ensure that the interests of Croats, Serbs and national minorities are fairly represented during government creation and in the legislative process.

The Federation is also divided into ten highly autonomous cantons. They each have their own governments, assemblies and exclusive and shared competencies. In 2010 the Federation's Constitutional Court ruled that two Federation's ministries – the Ministry of Education and Science and the Ministry of Culture and Sports – are unconstitutional since education and culture are an exclusive competence of the cantons.

Political divisions

The Federation of Bosnia and Herzegovina comprises ten cantons (Bosnian: kantoni, Croatian: županije):

Proposed Croat entity

Demographics 

The Federation of Bosnia and Herzegovina comprises 51% of the land area of Bosnia and Herzegovina, and is home to 62.85% of the country's total population.

See also
 Political divisions of Bosnia and Herzegovina
 History of Bosnia and Herzegovina
 Proposed Croat federal unit in Bosnia and Herzegovina

Notes

References

Sources

External links

Website of the Federation Government
Parliament of the Federation
Constitution of the Federation of Bosnia and Herzegovina
Website for persons unaccounted for in connection with the conflict on the territory of Bosnia and Herzegovina, International Committee of the Red Cross.
BalkanInsight – Future of Bosnia and Hercegovina

 
Entities of Bosnia and Herzegovina
Subdivisions of Bosnia and Herzegovina
Bosnian-speaking countries and territories
Croatian-speaking countries and territories
Serbian-speaking countries and territories
1994 establishments in Bosnia and Herzegovina
States and territories established in 1994
Regions of Europe with multiple official languages